The C POSIX library is a specification of a C standard library for POSIX systems. It was developed at the same time as the ANSI C standard. Some effort was made to make POSIX compatible with standard C; POSIX includes additional functions to those introduced in standard C.

C POSIX library header files

References
 Official List of headers in the POSIX library on opengroup.org
 
 Description of the posix library from the Flux OSKit

Further reading

 

 
POSIX